The 1924 CCNY Lavender football team was an American football team that represented the City College of New York (CCNY) as an independent during the 1924 college football season. In their first season under Harold J. Parker, the Lavender team compiled a 4–3 record.

Schedule

References

CCNY
CCNY Beavers football seasons
CCNY Lavender football